ARM Netzahualcóyotl (D-102), a , is one of two destroyers in the Mexican Navy. Mexico purchased Steinaker from the United States Navy in 1982, and renamed it after the Acolhua polymath Nezahualcoyotl. The destroyer was modified by the Mexican Navy, and in its present configuration it has a helicopter landing pad and an ASROC anti-submarine missile system. Netzahualcóyotl is used in drug interdiction and training missions for cadets from the Mexican Naval Academy, sailing annually up to San Francisco, California, in the United States.

Netzahualcóyotl was retired in 2014 and is slated to be sunk as an artificial reef.

External links
 Mexican Navy warship list (in Spanish)
 Flickr gallery of ARM Netzahualcoyotl photos
 Quetzalcóatl class specifications (in Spanish)

 

Quetzalcóatl-class destroyers
Ships built in Staten Island
1945 ships
Destroyers of Mexico